Thomas Ronald "Tom" Baron ( 1938 – 27 April 1967) was a quality control and safety inspector for North American Aviation (NAA), when it was the primary contractor to build the Apollo command module.

Biography
Baron was born in Wilkes-Barre. and attended Liberty High School in Bethlehem, Pennsylvania.

Baron was initially employed by the U.S. Air Force, and stationed at Eglin Air Force Base. He was later hired as a quality control inspector with North American Aviation, the prime NASA contractor for construction of the Apollo spaceship.

Baron's report
Baron compiled a 169-page report critical of safety standards at North American Aviation, and leaked his report to the media. After NAA learned of this, they fired him. 

After the Apollo 1 fire, Baron wrote a 275-page report on NASA safety protocol violations, which he gave to Rep. Olin E. Teague's investigation at Cape Kennedy, Florida, on April 21, 1967.

The chairman of the NASA Oversight Committee claimed that Baron had made a valuable contribution to the Apollo fire probe, but that he had been "overzealous".

Death
Six days after his testimony, Baron was killed instantly, along with his wife and stepdaughter, when a train crashed into their car near their home in Florida.

References

External links
 Smithsonian, Denying the Apollo Moon Landings
 Missing 500 page report

1967 deaths
Apollo program
Apollo 1
North American Aviation
Road incident deaths in Florida
Place of birth missing
Place of death missing
People from Wilkes-Barre, Pennsylvania
Liberty High School (Bethlehem, Pennsylvania) alumni
Year of birth uncertain
1930s births